Goat Blocks is a mixed-use development in Portland, Oregon, United States.

The complex was built on a 2-acre field which was previously home to a herd of goats, nicknamed the "Belmont Goats".

Killian Pacific's development project includes a grocery store (Market of Choice), a hardware store, and an apartment complex. The non-alcoholic pop-up restaurant Suckerpunch operated at the Goat Blocks in 2022.

References

External links

 

Buckman, Portland, Oregon
Mixed-use developments in the United States